Kærlighed og Mobilisering is a 1915 Danish silent film directed by Lau Lauritzen Sr. The film stars Frederik Buch and Henny Lauritzen.

Cast
Frederik Buch - Fuldmægtig Bømler
Henny Lauritzen - Enkefrue Siversen
Helen Gammeltoft - Julie, enkefruens datter
Gunnar Sommerfeldt - Hansen, Julies forlovede
Ingeborg Bruhn Bertelsen
Ingeborg Olsen
Ebba Lorentzen

External links
Danish Film Institute 

1915 films
Danish silent films
Films directed by Lau Lauritzen Sr.
Danish black-and-white films